Lowell School in Boise, Idaho, is a -story, brick and stone elementary school constructed in 1913 and named for James Russell Lowell. The building was expanded in 1916, 1926, and 1948, and it was added to the National Register of Historic Places (NRHP) in 1982.

The NRHP nomination form credits Tacoma architects Heath & Twitchell with the design, but in 1913 The Idaho Statesman reported that plans and specifications had been prepared by students in the Drafting Department at Boise High School.

References

External links
 
 Lowell School website

Further reading
 J. Howard Moon, A Centennial History of Schools of the State of Idaho (State School Boards Association, 1990), pp 1-12

		
National Register of Historic Places in Boise, Idaho
School buildings completed in 1913
Schools in Ada County, Idaho
School buildings on the National Register of Historic Places in Idaho
1913 establishments in Idaho